The Stockholm Regional Council, is a regional council, a regional municipal body corresponding to the territory of Stockholm County in Sweden. Its main responsibilities are the public healthcare system and public transport.

New name 
Starting from 2019, the Stockholm County Council changed its name to Region Stockholm.

Landsting 
The regional council election results 2018:

See also 
Karolinska University Hospital
Storstockholms Lokaltrafik
Stockholm metro (operated by MTR Corporation)
Roslagsbanan
Politics of Sweden
Elections in Sweden
Stockholm Municipality
List of governors of Stockholm County

References

External links 
Official website of Region Stockholm

County Councils of Sweden